Zinat Sanu Swagata; better known as  Swagata  is a Bangladeshi actress, presenter and musician.

Biography 
At the age of three and a half years, she entered into the world of acting as a child artist in Linza film. Then, as a child artist, in honor, Satiputra Abdullah and Top Mustaine films. Swagata commenced singing from early childhood. In the Notun Kuri competition, Swagata became first runner up. She completed study in Film and Media Studies at Stamford University Bangladesh

Filmography
 Linza
  Somman 
 Satiputra Abdullah
 Top Mastan
 Satru Satru khela
  Koti takar fokir
 Asanta Mon
 Dubshatar
 Phire Esho Behula
 Suchonā Rekhar dike
 Laal Moroger Jhuti (2021)
 Paap Punno (2022)

Television appearances

Advertisements 
 Pran Cola
 Cocola Noodles
  Standard Chartered Bank, Bangladesh
 Grameenphone
 Bizli Cable

Award 
 You Got The Look 2005

Personal life
On 23 September 2017, Swagata married photographer Rashed Zaman. Rashed Zaman was involved in the filming of the film Aynabaji.

References

Living people
Bangladeshi film actresses
Bengali television actresses
Year of birth missing (living people)
Bangladeshi television actresses
21st-century Bangladeshi actresses